"Why Can't You Free Some Time" is a song from the American electronic musician and producer Armand Van Helden, taken from his fifth album, Gandhi Khan, released in 2001. The song samples the track "Takin' the Time to Find" by Dave Mason.

Charts

References

2001 singles
Armand Van Helden songs
2001 songs
Songs written by Dave Mason
Songs written by Armand Van Helden